Pasaporte a la isla (English: Passport to the island), is a reality TV contest broadcast on Telecinco and produced by Magnolia for the summer season of the channel. The reality show, which premiered on July 19, 2015, is hosted by Jordi González and Laura Lobo.

A spin-off of Supervivientes, the prize is a spot to participate in Supervivientes 2016.

Finishing order

Nominations 

Spanish reality television series
Survivor Spain seasons